Shree Pavapuri Tirth Dham is situated at Sirohi district of Rajasthan. This temple was built by K. P. Sanghvi Group and it comprises a Jain Tirth (Temple complex) and Jeev Raksha Kendra (Animal Welfare Center).

Campus
The Tirth derived its name after the Pavada Agriculture well that exists there.

Shri Kumarpalbhai V. Shah inspired Late Shri Hajarimalji Poonamchandji Sanghvi (Bafna) and Shri Babulalji Poonamchandji Sanghvi (Bafna), the founders of K. P. Sanghvi Group, to construct a Tirth Dham. They started construction and development of the campus on 30 May 1998, Saturday (Jeth Shukla 15, 2054 V. S.). The temple complex occupies  area and the Jeev Raksha Kendra (Animal Welfare Center) occupies .

It took two and a half years to construct the temple with an average of 400 artisans working daily. The construction was completed on 7 February 2001, Wednesday (Magh Shukla 14, 2057 V. S.) and was finally opened for worship.

Animal Welfare Center
The campus has an Animal Welfare Center that tends to stray cows, buffaloes, dogs and donkeys. To take care of the animals, the Center also employs over 150 people and a few veterinary doctors.

See also 
 Jal Mandir, Pawapuri

References

Citations

Sources 
 

Jain temples in Rajasthan
Sirohi district
Cattle welfare organisations based in India
Animal welfare and rights in India
Tourist attractions in Sirohi district
21st-century Jain temples